Maculoncus is a genus of dwarf spiders that was first described by J. Wunderlich in 1995.  it contains only three species, found in Georgia, Greece, Israel, Russia, and Taiwan: M. obscurus, M. orientalis, and M. parvipalpus.

See also
 List of Linyphiidae species (I–P)

References

Araneomorphae genera
Linyphiidae
Spiders of Asia